Sandro Finoglio (born Sandro Finoglio Esperanza; January 3, 1973) is a Venezuelan actor, model, TV host. Winner of the Mister Venezuela national title in 1997, Finoglio was sent to Troia, Portugal a year later to compete in the Mister World competition, which he won. His father is from Rome and his Mother is from Pisa.

Television acting credits 
" Ellas, inocentes o culpables " (In Mexico)
" Secreto de amor " (In  United States, Univisión)
" Gata Salvaje " (In  United States, Univisión)
" Por Todo lo Alto " (In Venezuela, RCTV)

References

External links
 

Mister World winners
Venezuelan male television actors
Venezuelan people of Italian descent
Venezuelan male models
Living people
1973 births
Venezuelan beauty pageant winners
Male beauty pageant winners